The Heterandriini is a tribe of killifishes from the "livebearer" family Poeciliidae, consisting of seven genera and around 50 species. The tribe was originally delineated by Carl Leavitt Hubbs in 1924.

Genera
The genera classified in this tribe are:

 Heterandria Agassiz, 1853
 Neoheterandria Henn, 1916
 Poeciliopsis Regan, 1913
 Priapichthys Regan 1913
 Pseudopoecilia Regan 1913
 Pseudoxiphophorus Bleeker, 1860
 Xenophallus Hubbs, 1924

References

Poeciliidae